
The Avia BH-4 was a prototype fighter aircraft built in Czechoslovakia in 1922. It was a development of the BH-3 fitted with a Hispano-Suiza 8 engine in an attempt to improve the aircraft's performance. To accommodate the new powerplant, the forward fuselage was considerably redesigned, and the structure in general and undercarriage in particular were strengthened. Performance was found to be only marginally better than the BH-3, and development was quickly abandoned.

Specifications

See also

References

 
 
 Němeček, V. (1968). Československá letadla. Praha: Naše Vojsko.
 airwar.ru

1920s Czechoslovakian fighter aircraft
BH-04
Low-wing aircraft
Single-engined tractor aircraft